Sara Anna van de Geer (born 7 May 1958, Leiden) is a Dutch statistician who is a professor in the department of mathematics at ETH Zurich. She is the daughter of psychologist John P. van de Geer.

Education 
She earned a master's degree in 1982 and a doctorate in mathematics in 1987 from Leiden University. Her dissertation, entitled Regression Analysis and Empirical Processes, was supervised by Willem Rutger van Zwet and Richard D. Gill.

Career 
She taught at the University of Bristol from 1987 to 1988, at Utrecht University from 1989 to 1990, at Leiden University from 1990 to 1997 and 1999 to 2005, and at Paul Sabatier University in Toulouse, France, from 1997 to 1999, before moving to ETH Zurich in September 2005 as Full Professor. There, she has been the first female professor at the Department of Mathematics.

Recognition 
She was an invited speaker at the International Congress of Mathematicians in 2010 and received the Van Wijngaarden Award in 2016.
She is a member of the Academy of Sciences Leopoldina and of the International Statistical Institute, a corresponding member of the Royal Netherlands Academy of Arts and Sciences, and a fellow of the Institute of Mathematical Statistics. She became a member of the Academia Europaea in 2020. She was president of the Bernoulli Society for Mathematical Statistics and Probability for the term 2015–2017. In 2018 she was appointed as a member of the Scientific Committee of the Mathematical Research Institute of Oberwolfach. In 2022 she was elected as an international member to the National Academy of Sciences (NAS).

Bibliography

Textbooks and lecture notes

References

External links
 

1958 births
20th-century Dutch mathematicians
21st-century Dutch mathematicians
Dutch women mathematicians
Women statisticians
Dutch statisticians
Living people
People from Leiden
Leiden University alumni
Academic staff of Leiden University
Academic staff of Utrecht University
Academic staff of ETH Zurich
Dutch expatriates in Switzerland 
Elected Members of the International Statistical Institute
Fellows of the Institute of Mathematical Statistics
Members of the Royal Netherlands Academy of Arts and Sciences
Members of Academia Europaea
20th-century women mathematicians
21st-century women mathematicians
Members of the German Academy of Sciences Leopoldina
20th-century Dutch women
Mathematical statisticians